Norbit is a 2007 American comedy film, directed by Brian Robbins, and co-written by, co-produced by, and starring Eddie Murphy. The film co-stars Thandie Newton, Terry Crews, Cuba Gooding Jr., Eddie Griffin, Katt Williams, Marlon Wayans, and Charlie Murphy. It was released by DreamWorks and Paramount Pictures on February 9, 2007. Eddie Murphy portrays multiple roles including the eponymous Norbit and his abusive obese wife Rasputia; regretting ever having married her, Norbit decides he has had enough of her behavior at about the same time that his childhood sweetheart Kate returns to his life with plans for the orphanage where Norbit and Kate grew up. Norbit risks everything to be with her, but must also contend with Rasputia who has an agenda of her own.

The film was a box office success; it grossed $159 million worldwide against a production budget of $60 million. It was negatively received by critics, and was nominated for eight Golden Raspberry Awards, as well as nominated for the Academy Award for Best Makeup.

Plot
Childhood friends Norbit Albert Rice and Kate Thomas live at an orphanage doubling as a Chinese restaurant called The Golden Wonton owned by Mr. Hangten Wong. They also play-marry each other with Ring Pops, but are separated after Kate is adopted two weeks later.

Five years later, a tough, overweight girl named Rasputia Latimore rescues Norbit from playground bullies and eventually becomes his girlfriend, but soon grows into an arrogant and tyrannical woman. They marry each other as adults, but Rasputia begins insulting and controlling him, especially accusing him of adjusting her car seat when she is driving her car. Norbit is also belittled by Rasputia's three older brothers Big Black Jack, Blue, and Earl, working as a bookkeeper at their construction company. The Latimore brothers run a "security business", instilling fear in the entire community except Mr. Wong, who refuses to sell them his business and does not hesitate to use his spear and pistol to intimidate them.

After catching Rasputia cheating on him with her tap dance instructor Buster Perkin, Norbit calls her the "Queen of Whores" during their argument, which results in her chasing him through the neighborhood. Afterwards, he discards his wedding ring and vents his anger about Rasputia's infidelity at a puppet show for the orphans. He is stunned to see Kate for the first time since childhood, and his affection for her reignites as he learns she is using the money she obtained from selling her clothing business in Atlanta to buy Mr. Wong's orphanage, but is disappointed to learn she is engaged to a man named Deion Hughes.

Aided by ex-pimp friends Pope Sweet Jesus and Lord Have Mercy and the other townspeople, Norbit meets Kate without Rasputia's knowledge and along the way, Kate teaches Norbit how to ride a bike. Deion attempts to leave town, having no intention to help Kate run the orphanage, but the Latimore brothers persuade him to help them turn the orphanage into a strip club named "Nipplopolis" instead and dupe Norbit into getting Kate to sign papers to renew the restaurant's liquor license in the Latimores' name. Norbit's meeting with Kate leads to helping rehearse her wedding, where a kiss between them makes her reconsider marrying Deion. Norbit returns home to learn Rasputia witnessed their kiss and threatens violence towards Kate if he ever sees her again.

When Kate later learns about the deal from Deion, she goes to confront Norbit and sees him being imprisoned by Rasputia, who masterminded the orphanage plot, in their basement. Norbit reluctantly insults her and drives her away to protect her from Rasputia. Satisfied, Rasputia lies that Norbit tricked Kate since she came back to town. Heartbroken, Kate runs away and a guilt-ridden Norbit decides to permanently leave town but then finds a letter from the private investigator he hired, discovering Deion has accumulated a total of $300,000 in divorce settlements from his four marriages in the last six years to four different women.

The Latimores reveal their plan to Norbit, and lock him in the basement again. Norbit escapes by bike, reaching the wedding just in time to inform Kate of Deion's schemes. Though his proof of Deion's divorce settlements was destroyed after falling into a pond, Norbit executes his backup plan by revealing Deion's ex-wives and children, and Deion flees as they give chase, which results in the Latimores' plan backfiring.

The Latimores attack Norbit for sabotaging their plans, but the townspeople take up arms to protect him as his bravery has inspired them to stand up to the Latimores. Rasputia fights her way through the crowd and prepares to kill him, but Mr. Wong harpoons her in the rear, causing her to rapidly run in pain out of town. With their sister gone, the Latimore brothers finally accept defeat and are chased out of town while Norbit and Kate reconcile, buy the orphanage, and marry under the same tree where they played as children years ago, finally living happily ever after. Rasputia and the Latimores are never seen or heard from again, but several rumors say that they move to Mexico and open up their strip club "El Nipplopolis", where Rasputia becomes their most popular and lucrative stripper.

Cast

Production
After the success of Shrek, DreamWorks co-founder and CEO Jeffrey Katzenberg signed up Eddie Murphy to star in a live-action followup, and they were looking for the right film. Norbit seemed like a good fit, following on from playing multiple characters in a family comedy as Murphy had done before with Dr. Dolittle and The Nutty Professor. DreamWorks production president Adam Goodman brought the script to Brian Robbins and he was excited about the prospect of working with Eddie Murphy. Norbit was the first of three films where director Brian Robbins and Eddie Murphy worked together. They later collaborated for Meet Dave and A Thousand Words. Murphy wrote the story after watching videos online "where really large women, African-American women, would beat up their tiny husbands" which he found hilarious. Although always intended to be a comedy early drafts of the script were much darker. According to Thandie Newton during filming the stand-ins were very convincing and she frequently filmed scenes with them and not Murphy himself.

The various prosthetic makeups, bodysuits, and wigs were created by Rick Baker and his company Cinovation. Baker praised Murphy saying "He really makes the stuff come to life, and he never complains. When we did 'The Nutty Professor' [...], he spent 80-odd days in the makeup chair. As much as I love makeup, even I would have been complaining by the end, but Eddie didn't."

Rick Baker wanted to work from a real life model and auditioned over a hundred extra large ladies, all with the necessary proportions. The model also needed to be able to dance. After several rounds of auditions, one lady was chosen as the life model for Rasputia and a foam latex suit was created based on her measurements. The surfaces was painted with silicone to make it look like skin. Silicone was also used to make matching gloves. The shape of Murphy's face was changed using foam latex and pieces of silicone, which were then painted over in various tones of red, brown and yellow to create realistic looking skin tone. A body double was used for some scenes, particularly the water park. Murphy with his face in makeup as Rasputia performed against green screen and his head was digitally composited onto the body double.

Reception

Critical response
 
On Rotten Tomatoes the film has an approval rating of 9% based on 124 reviews, with an average rating of 3.6/10, with the site's consensus reading, "Coming off his Oscar-nominated performance in Dreamgirls, the talented-but-inconsistent Eddie Murphy plays three roles in Norbit, a cruel, crass, stereotype-filled comedy that's more depressing than funny." Metacritic gave the movie a score of 27 out of 100, based on reviews from 26 critics, indicating "generally unfavorable reviews". Audiences polled by CinemaScore gave the film a B grade, with under eighteens (28% of those surveyed) giving it a B+ grade.

Mick LaSalle of the San Francisco Chronicle gave the movie a positive review, suggesting that Norbit might help Murphy's chances of winning an Oscar for his role in Dreamgirls, saying that his work playing three distinct characters in Norbit is more impressive than anything he did in Dreamgirls. Others suggested it might hurt his chances. Ultimately, Alan Arkin won the award for Best Supporting Actor.

Luke Sader of The Hollywood Reporter called it "Racially insensitive, politically incorrect and beyond crude." Scott Tobias of The A.V. Club gave the film a grade of "F" and wrote: "It probably isn't possible for a single movie to reverse all social progress made since the civil-rights era, but Norbit, the latest broadside from Eddie Murphy, does its best to turn back the clock" and "hideously offensive black stereotypes are merely the tip of the iceberg." Josh Tyler of CinemaBlend gave the movie a mostly negative review, in which he described parts of the film as "pretty despicable" and stated that "the plot relies on the idea that being fat also means you're a horrible bitch." However, he pointed out that "some of it's also kind of sweet. Eddie's really quite good as Norbit, the character is sympathetic and funny. He has a strange sort of perfect chemistry with Thandie Newton, and that's just not something I would have expected."

Liz Braun of Jam! Movies described Norbit as "mostly blubber jokes about how fat Rasputia really is" but said that "the movie is not without genuine laughs. Most of those laughs are generated by the other actors." In regard to the "terrifying" character Rasputia, she went so far as to say that the film "tends to confirm one's worst suspicions about Murphy and what appears to be his general fear and loathing of women. The Rasputia gag gets a little freaky if you think about it too much. And you wouldn't want to dwell on how much Thandie Newton looks like a slender boy in her role as Norbit's true love, either. So don't."

Black activists took issue with Eddie Murphy's portrayal of the character Rasputia, calling Norbit "just the latest [film built] around a black man dressing up as an unsophisticated, overweight black woman." Film critic MaryAnn Johanson said it was a minstrel show and called it a "hideous stew of bigoted "humor"".

The New Yorker film critic Richard Brody praised Murphy's performances saying "playing multiple roles, Murphy unleashes, with a sense of painful revelation, a tangle of rage, cringing fear, furious power, and a sense of perpetual and unresolved outsiderness." He rated it 17th of 30 top acting performances of the 21st century.

Musician Brian Wilson of The Beach Boys called Norbit his favourite movie in a 2007 interview with the Asbury Park Press.

Director's response
Director Brian Robbins praised Murphy's performance saying "Eddie Murphy plays three amazingly different characters brilliantly. How could you not praise that? No offense to Alan Arkin, but he couldn't do what Eddie did in 'Norbit.'" Robbins reacted to the negative reviews from critics, "Is the audience that stupid? Is America's taste that bad? I don't think so." He also claimed "The only films that get good reviews are the ones that nobody sees. I just don't think you can make movies for critics". Robbins defended his star-driven, high-concept movies’ approach to filmmaking saying: "Don't pay attention to tracking, and don't read the reviews ... Funny trumps. Work with movie stars."

Jim Emerson of RogerEbert.com agreed that filmmakers like Robbins should ignore critics and made note of the ancient analogy about McDonald's and food critics. He suggested that Robbins films "were neither designed for, nor marketed to, people who pay all that much attention to movie critics". Emerson pointed out several of the top grossing films of 2006 that got both good reviews from critics and gained wide audiences.

Box office
Industry projections expected Norbit to earn about $20 million in its opening weekend, and Paramount were projecting earnings of $25 million. The film opened to $34.2 million in the United States, and was Eddie Murphy's 14th #1 box office opener. The film earned $95,673,607 at the North American domestic box office, and $63,639,954 in other markets, for a total of $159,313,561 worldwide. The film was released in the United Kingdom on March 9, 2007, and topped the country's box office for the next two weekends, before being overtaken by 300.

Accolades

Norbit was nominated for eight Golden Raspberry Awards including Worst Picture, and won three awards, all for Eddie Murphy as three different characters.
The film was also nominated for an Academy Award for Best Makeup.

Soundtrack

The soundtrack for Norbit was released on February 6, 2007 by Lakeshore Records.

 "Standing in the Safety Zone" – The Fairfield Four (2:41)
 "It's Goin' Down" – Yung Joc (4:03)
 "You Did" – Kate Earl feat. The Designated Hitters (2:26)
 "Sexual Healing" – Marvin Gaye 
 "I Only Want to Be with You" – Dusty Springfield (2:37)
 "Milkshake" – Kelis (3:04)
 "Shoppin' for Clothes" – The Coasters (2:58)
 "Walk It Out" – Unk (2:54)
 "Looking for You" – Kirk Franklin (4:06)
 "Sweet Honey" – Slightly Stoopid (3:52)
 "The Hands of Time" – Perfect Circle (6:19)
 "Young Norbit" – David Newman (3:33)
 "Queen of Whores" – David Newman (:46)
 "Kate Returns"/"Tuesday, Tuesday" – David Newman (3:24)
 "Norbit Sneaks Out" – David Newman (:33)
 "Rasputia's Fury" – David Newman (1:44)
 "Norbit and Kate" – David Newman (:55)

Several songs were used in the film which do not appear on the soundtrack album, in order of appearance:

 "You Are the Woman", performed by Firefall
 "(Your Love Keeps Lifting Me) Higher and Higher", performed by Jackie Wilson
 "Dem Jeans", performed by Chingy
 "Chain Hang Low", performed by Jibbs
 "Don't Cha", performed by The Pussycat Dolls
 "Ride of the Valkyries" by Richard Wagner
 "Temperature", performed by Sean Paul

The song "Tonight, I Celebrate My Love" is sung at Norbit and Rasputia's wedding party, but likewise does not appear on the soundtrack album.

Home media
Norbit was released on Blu-ray Disc, DVD, and HD DVD on June 5, 2007.

References

External links

 
 
 

2007 comedy films
2007 films
Adultery in films
American romantic comedy films
Davis Entertainment films
DreamWorks Pictures films
Films directed by Brian Robbins
Films set in Tennessee
Films shot in California
Films with screenplays by Eddie Murphy
Cross-dressing in American films
African-American comedy films
Films scored by David Newman
Films about marriage
Films about orphans
African-American films
Films produced by John Davis
Films about striptease
Films about obesity
Golden Raspberry Award winning films
Paramount Pictures films
2000s English-language films
2000s American films